Buy One Get One Free is an album by pianist Andy LaVerne performing on two Yamaha Grand Pianos recorded in 1992 and released on the Danish label, SteepleChase.

Reception 

Ken Dryden of AllMusic stated "LaVerne makes use of the full range of both keyboards combined for a richly textured arrangement. This is a very interesting experiment worth acquiring by fans of duo piano".

Track listing 
All compositions by Andy LaVerne except where noted.
 "Pairs of Chairs" – 4:59
 "Orbit (Unless It's You)" (Bill Evans) – 6:48
 "Fine Tune" – 5:36
 "Maiden Voyage" (Herbie Hancock) – 7:22
 "Buy One, Get One Free" – 6:11
 "By Myself" (Arthur Schwartz, Howard Dietz) – 7:22
 "Elm" (Richie Beirach) – 6:17
 "Invisible Denial" – 4:21
 "Intervallic Denial" – 4:21
 "Spain" (Chick Corea) – 7:27

Personnel 
Andy LaVerne – Grand Pianos (Yamaha DC7F and Yamaha CF7), disklavier

References 

 

Andy LaVerne albums
1993 albums
Solo piano jazz albums
SteepleChase Records albums